Messor is a myrmicine genus of ants with more than 100 species, all of which are harvester ants; the generic name comes from the Roman god of crops and harvest, Messor. The subterranean colonies tend to be found in open fields and near roadsides, openings are directly to the surface.

Colonies can achieve huge sizes and are notable for their intricately designed granaries in which seeds are stored in dry conditions, preventing germination. The structure of Messor spp. nests is complex and the genus on the whole is one of very accomplished architects.

Messor spp. are polymorphic and have a distinct caste of macrocephalic dinoergates whose role is carrying and cutting the large seeds which comprise much of the colonies' subsistence. Although they primarily feed on seeds, they occasionally eat insects and snails. Some snail shells possibly are taken into the nest because of their grain-like shape.

Equipped with a tough, shining cuticle, Messor spp. are slow-moving and form long, seed-carrying runs. Colonies tend to be monogynous - founded by a single queen alone.

Looking specifically at the M. arenarius species for example, like some other types of harvester ants, they emit trail pheromones as well as operating on an individual level when looking for food sources.

Species

 Messor abdelazizi Santschi, 1921
 Messor aciculatus (Smith, 1874)
 Messor aegyptiacus (Emery, 1878)
 Messor alexandri Tohme, 1981
 Messor andrei (Mayr, 1886)
 Messor angularis Santschi, 1928
 Messor antennatus Emery, 1908
 Messor aphaenogasteroides Pisarski, 1967
 Messor aralocaspius Ruzsky, 1902
 Messor arenarius (Fabricius, 1787)
 Messor atanassovii Atanassov, 1982
 Messor barbarus (Linnaeus, 1767)
 Messor beduinus Emery, 1922
 Messor berbericus Bernard, 1955
 Messor bernardi Cagniant, 1967
 Messor bouvieri Bondroit, 1918
 Messor buettikeri Collingwood, 1985
 Messor caducus (Victor, 1839)
 Messor capensis (Mayr, 1862)
 Messor capitatus (Latreille, 1798)
 Messor carthaginensis Bernard, 1980
 Messor caviceps (Forel, 1902)
 Messor celiae Reyes, 1985
 Messor cephalotes (Emery, 1895)
 Messor ceresis Santschi, 1934
 Messor chamberlini Wheeler, 1915
 Messor clypeatus Kuznetsov-Ugamsky, 1927
 Messor collingwoodi Bolton, 1982
 Messor concolor Santschi, 1927
 Messor decipiens Santschi, 1917
 Messor dentatus Santschi, 1927
 Messor denticornis Forel, 1910
 Messor denticulatus Santschi, 1927
 Messor diabarensis Arnol'di, 1969
 Messor ebeninus Santschi, 1927
 Messor excursionis Ruzsky, 1905
 Messor ferreri Collingwood, 1993
 Messor foreli Santschi, 1923
 Messor fraternus Ruzsky, 1905
 Messor galla (Mayr, 1904)
 Messor hebraeus Santschi, 1927
 Messor hellenius Agosti & Collingwood, 1987
 Messor himalayanus (Forel, 1902)
 Messor hispanicus Santschi, 1919
 Messor ibericus Santschi, 1931
 Messor incisus Stitz, 1923
 Messor incorruptus Kuznetsov-Ugamsky, 1929
 Messor inermis Kuznetsov-Ugamsky, 1929
 Messor instabilis (Smith, 1858)
 Messor intermedius Santschi, 1927
 Messor julianus (Pergande, 1894)
 Messor kasakorum Arnol'di, 1969
 Messor kisilkumensis Arnol'di, 1969
 Messor lamellicornis Arnol'di, 1968
 Messor lariversi (Smith, 1951)
 Messor lobicornis Forel, 1894
 Messor lobognathus Andrews, 1916
 Messor luebberti Forel, 1910
 Messor luridus Santschi, 1927
 Messor lusitanicus Tinaut, 1985
 Messor maculifrons Santschi, 1927
 Messor marikovskii Arnol'di, 1969
 Messor marocanus Santschi, 1927
 Messor medioruber Santschi, 1910
 Messor melancholicus Arnol'di, 1977
 Messor minor (Andre, 1883)
 Messor nahali Tohme, 1981
 Messor niloticus Santschi, 1938
 Messor oertzeni Forel, 1910
 Messor olegianus Arnol'di, 1969
 Messor orientalis (Emery, 1898)
 Messor perantennatus Arnol'di, 1969
 Messor pergandei (Mayr, 1886)
 Messor piceus Stitz, 1923
 Messor picturatus Santschi, 1927
 Messor planiceps Stitz, 1917
 Messor postpetiolatus Santschi, 1917
 Messor regalis (Emery, 1892)
 Messor reticuliventris Karavaiev, 1910
 Messor rufotestaceus (Foerster, 1850)
 Messor rufus Santschi, 1923
 Messor ruginodis Stitz, 1916
 Messor rugosus (Andre, 1881)
 Messor sanctus Emery, 1921
 Messor sculpturatus Carpenter, 1930
 Messor semirufus (Andre, 1883)
 Messor semoni (Forel, 1906)
 Messor smithi (Cole, 1963)
 Messor sordidus (Forel, 1892)
 Messor stoddardi (Emery, 1895)
 Messor striatellus Arnol'di, 1969
 Messor striaticeps (Andre, 1883)
 Messor striatifrons Stitz, 1923
 Messor striativentris Emery, 1908
 Messor structor (Latreille, 1798)
 Messor subgracilinodis Arnol'di, 1969
 Messor sultanus Santschi, 1917
 Messor syriacus Tohme, 1969
 Messor testaceus Donisthorpe, 1950
 Messor timidus (Espadaler, 1997)
 Messor tropicorum Wheeler, 1922
 Messor turcmenochorassanicus Arnol'di, 1977
 Messor valentinae Arnol'di, 1969
 Messor variabilis Kuznetsov-Ugamsky, 1927
 Messor vaucheri Emery, 1908
 Messor vicinus Kuznetsov-Ugamsky, 1927
 Messor wasmanni Krausse, 1910

References

External links

Myrmicinae
Ant genera